El Observador is Spanish for "The Observer". It may refer to:

Journalism
El Observador (Chile), a Chilean newspaper published in Quillota
El Observador (Costa Rica), a Costa Rican newspaper
El Observador (San Jose), a Californian newspaper published in San Jose
El Observador (Spain), a Spanish newspaper published in Málaga
El Observador (Uruguay), a Uruguayan newspaper published in Montevideo
El Observador (Venezuelan TV program), a Venezuelan newscast of Radio Caracas Televisión 
El Observador de la Realidad, a former Catalan newspaper
El Observador Ponceño, a former Puerto Rican newspaper
Observador, a Portuguese newspaper

Comics
El Observador (comics), a comic book supervillain appearing in comic books published by Azteca Productions